Charles Covington Jr. is an American jazz pianist and a U.S. Life Master in chess.

Career
A native of Baltimore, Covington became interested in jazz when the high school principal broadcast music by Errol Garner and Ahmad Jamal on the intercom. He served in the U.S. Army, attended the Peabody Institute, and learned piano and organ at the Hammond School of Music. He performed in clubs and at the Royal Theater. After the manager of George Benson heard Covington perform in New York City, he invited him to tour with Benson. He also worked with Ethel Ennis, J.J. Johnson, O'Donel Levy, and Nathan Page.

An interest in chess led Covington to chess clubs in New York. He has been certified a Life Master  by the U.S. Chess Federation and is considered one of the top black chess players in the country. He has written books on chess, checkers, and math. For twenty years he taught at the Peabody Conservatory, then at Howard University. Covington has also performed as a magician. He was the pianist for the television program BET on Jazz.

Awards and honors
 On the cover of Expo magazine as Jazz Musician of the Year, 1983
 Jazz pianist in residence, Kennedy Center
 Life Master, U.S. Chess Federation

Discography

As leader
 It's Time for Love (Jazz Karma, 1992)

As sideman
With O'Donel Levy
 Black Velvet (Groove Merchant, 1971)
 Breeding of Mind (Groove Merchant, 1972)
 Dawn of a New Day  (Groove Merchant, 1973)
 Everything I Do Gonna Be Funky (Groove Merchant, 1974)
 Windows (Groove Merchant, 1976)

With Nathen Page
 Page 1 (Hugo's Music, 1977)
 Page 2 (Hugo's Music, 1978)
 Plays Pretty for the People (Hugo's Music, 1979)

With others
 George Benson, Shape of Things to Come (A&M/CTI, 1968)
 J.J. Johnson & Kai Winding, Betwixt & Between (A&M/CTI, 1969)
 Ethel Ennis, 10 Sides of Ethel Ennis (BASF, 1973)
 Gary Thomas, Exile's Gate (JMT, 1993)

References

External links
 Official site
 The Talking Drum
 Kennedy Center

Living people
Year of birth missing (living people)
21st-century American male musicians
21st-century American pianists
American jazz pianists
American male pianists
American male jazz musicians